The Cause is a river in the Bouches-du-Rhône, France. It flows from its source in Vauvenargues to the river Arc near Palette. Recreational fishing is forbidden on Fridays except for bank holidays.

References

Rivers of Bouches-du-Rhône
Rivers of France
Rivers of Provence-Alpes-Côte d'Azur